In sports, stat padding is an action that improves a player's statistics despite being of little benefit to his or her team or its chance of winning. An example would be a gridiron football player throwing long passes with an empty backfield on first down in the fourth quarter of a game in which his team was already leading by a large margin.

Stat padding is also noticeable in online computer games. A group of players might perform a series of actions which generally require little skill in order to raise a player's statistics. For example, in first-person shooters, two or more players might join different teams and constantly kill one another, usually followed by a heal, revive, or respawn. Actions such as these are usually done on password-protected or empty game servers. An example of this in the popular online computer game Battlefield 2 would be when three players collude, one as a medic, another from the other team as a killer, and another person from the medic's team, called the "dummy", to be the victim. The killer shoots the dummy, and the medic then heals or revives his teammate. The killer shoots the dummy again and the process continues.

It is also possible to stat pad by completing objectives or performing actions in an empty server, or by co-operating with a player on another team. While co-operating with players on another team may pad stats, this is widely considered a form of cheating.

Notable players accused of 'stat padding'

Basketball 
Russell Westbrook holds the record for most career triple-doubles in the NBA, most of which involved heavy stat padding, many theorise.

Rajon Rondo is 14th all-time in career assists, and 16th in assists per game in the NBA, but it involved stat padding, such as passing up a wide open layup to increase his assists.

Giannis Antetokounmpo was accused of stat padding after he intentionally missed a last-second shot to get the rebound he needed to secure a triple-double. His last rebound was later rescinded by the NBA.

See also
Running up the score

References 

Sports records and statistics
Sports terminology